Manfred Erhardt (born 5 September 1946) is an East German sprint canoer who competed in the late 1960s. At the 1968 Summer Olympics in Mexico City, he was eliminated in the semifinals of the K-2 1000 m event.

References
Sports-reference.com profile

1946 births
Canoeists at the 1968 Summer Olympics
German male canoeists
Living people
Olympic canoeists of East Germany
Place of birth missing (living people)